Kelvis José Padrino Villazana (born 26 February 1997) is a Venezuelan sprinter specialising in the 400 metres. He won a gold medal at the 2021 South American Championships.

International competitions

Personal bests
Outdoor
100 metres – 10.75 seconds (-1.7 m/s, Barquisimeto 2021)
200 metres – 21.03 seconds (+1.9 m/s, Guayaquil 2021)
400 metres – 45.74 seconds (Barquisimeto 2021)

References

1997 births
Living people
Venezuelan male sprinters
Athletes (track and field) at the 2018 South American Games
South American Games competitors for Venezuela
Athletes (track and field) at the 2019 Pan American Games
Pan American Games competitors for Venezuela
People from Anzoátegui
South American Championships in Athletics winners
20th-century Venezuelan people
21st-century Venezuelan people